Beaumat is a former commune in the Lot department in southwestern France. On 1 January 2016, it was merged into the new commune of Cœur-de-Causse.

Geography
The river Céou forms part of the commune's northern border.

Population

See also
Communes of the Lot department

References

Former communes of Lot (department)